ATN Food Food is a Canadian exempt Category B Hindi language specialty channel owned by Asian Television Network (ATN). It broadcasts programming from Food Food as well as Canadian content.

ATN Food Food is a lifestyle channel with a focus on Indian cuisine and food culture.  Programming includes cooking shows, reality series, instructional shows, and food-related travel shows.

Programming
These shows have aired on ATN Food Food:

 Budget Kitchen
 Mummy Magic
 Roti Raasta Aur India
 Sanjeev Kapoor's Kitchen
 Style Chef
 Tea Time
 Turban Tadka
 Cook Smart

History
ATN Food Food was licensed by the CRTC on September 7, 2012 as ATN South Asian Cooking Channel 1.  It officially launched on November 29, 2012 as ATN Food Food.

On September 28, 2018, the CRTC approved Asian Television Network's request to convert ATN Food Food from a licensed Category B specialty service to an exempted Cat. B third language service.

References

External links
 
 Food Food

Digital cable television networks in Canada
Television channels and stations established in 2012
Hindi-language television in Canada